Yanamalakuduru is part of Vijayawada and a census town in Krishna district of the Indian state of Andhra Pradesh. It is  located in Penamaluru mandal of Vijayawada revenue division. As per the G.O. No. M.S.104 (dated:23-03-2017), Municipal Administration and Urban Development Department, it became a part of Vijayawada metropolitan area.

Education 
The primary and secondary school education is provided by government, aid and development groups, and private schools, under the School Education Department of the state. English and Telugu are the main languages of instruction.

See also 
List of census towns in Andhra Pradesh

References 

Census towns in Andhra Pradesh
Neighbourhoods in Vijayawada